Metapanax is a genus of flowering plants in the family Araliaceae, comprising 2 species. They are endemic to southern China and Vietnam.

References 

Araliaceae
Apiales genera